The Beijing–Washington hotline is a system that allows direct communication between the leaders of the United States and China. This hotline was established in November 2007, when China and the United States announced that they would set up a military hotline between Beijing and Washington D.C. to avoid misunderstanding during any moments of crisis in the Pacific.

History 

Discussions to set up a Beijing–Washington hotline started during a meeting between China's paramount leader Hu Jintao and U.S. President George W. Bush in April 2006.

On 5 November 2007, U.S. Defense Secretary Robert M. Gates told reporters that he and Chinese Defense Minister Cao Gangchuan formally agreed to set up the dedicated 24-hour phone line in Beijing. According to a report, China's Defense Ministry long resisted the idea of a direct line until June 2007, when General Zhang Qinsheng stated that China was ready to proceed with the establishment at the Shangri-La Dialogue security conference in Singapore. After a meeting in February 2008, China and the United States officially signed an agreement to set up a military hotline between the United States Department of Defense and the Ministry of National Defense of the People's Republic of China. The hotline was set up on 10 April 2008.

The Beijing–Washington hotline uses different procedures compared to the Moscow–Washington hotline which was set up after the Cuban Missile Crisis. The 2008 agreement with China arranges a call to be put through to the Zhongnanhai telecommunications directorate, which has discretion on whether to forward the call to the foreign affairs section of the Department of Defense or the PLA's command headquarters in West Beijing. Furthermore, in protest against US actions, the Chinese have cut off the hotline twice for extended time periods.

In September 2015, Chinese leader Xi Jinping and U.S. President Barack Obama announced agreements on a new military hotline to reduce the risks of accidental escalations between the two countries.

In May 2021, Kurt Campbell, the US policy coordinator for the Indo-Pacific, said that China had been reluctant to use the hotline, describing it as “the couple of times we've used it, just rung in an empty room for hours upon hours”.
In February 2023 Minister of Defense of China, Wei Fenghe, declined to respond to a call from U.S. Defense Secretary Lloyd Austin regarding a balloon over the Beaufort Sea in the vicinity of Deadhorse, Alaska, during the 2023 Chinese balloon incident.

Space hotline 

In November 2015, the U.S. and China set up a so-called space hotline, allowing both nations to easily share information about activities in space and help their space and military agencies to discuss "potential collisions, approaches, or tests" to prevent misunderstanding or miscommunication from escalating to a dangerous situation. According to U.S. Assistant Secretary Of State Frank Rose, an urgent safety mechanism was required due to the growing amount of potentially lethal space debris in orbit, as well as numerous undisclosed military satellite launches. The link was established amid tensions due to China ramping up tests of weapons designed to target the orbital networks upon which almost all US high-tech military capabilities depend.

Cyber hotline 

In November 2011, an editorial in the China Daily called for closer communication, especially in cases of an emergency concerning matters of cyberwarfare. This has been referred to as a call for a Sino-American cyber red phone.

See also 
Moscow–Washington hotline
Seoul–Pyongyang hotline
Islamabad–New Delhi hotline

China–United States relations

References 

Communication circuits
China–United States relations
Military communications of the United States
Military communications of China
Hotline between countries